Maysa Hussain Matrood (born 28 December 1977) is an Iraqi long-distance runner. She competed in the women's 5000 metres at the 2000 Summer Olympics.

References

1977 births
Living people
Athletes (track and field) at the 2000 Summer Olympics
Iraqi female long-distance runners
Olympic athletes of Iraq
Place of birth missing (living people)